"Leaning on a Lamp-post" is a popular song written by Noel Gay and best known in the version by George Formby.

It was first performed in the 1937 film Feather Your Nest, in contrasting styles by Val Rosing and George Formby.  The film's plot revolves around Formby, a gramophone record technician, hearing Rosing record the song but then breaking the master disc and substituting his own voice.  Formby recorded the song for Regal Zonophone Records on 5 September 1937, and it became one of his most popular and best-remembered songs. The sheet music for the song was published by Cinephonic Music Co Ltd. of London, at two shillings.

A version by Herman's Hermits, credited as "Leaning on the Lamp Post", reached number nine on the US Hot 100 in 1966.  The song was added into the 1985 production of Me and My Girl, but was not in the original 1937 version of the musical.

References

George Formby songs
Herman's Hermits songs
Songs with music by Noel Gay
1937 songs